The Gay Sisters is a 1942 American drama film directed by Irving Rapper, and starring Barbara Stanwyck, George Brent, Geraldine Fitzgerald, Donald Crisp, Gig Young (who adopted his character's name as his screen name) and Nancy Coleman. The Warner Bros. motion picture was based on a novel by Stephen Longstreet.

Plot
Sisters Fiona, Evelyn, and Susie Gaylord, are orphaned when first their mother goes down with the Lusitania and then their wealthy father, Major Penn Gaylord, is killed in France in World War I. Before Penn left for France, he told Fiona, the eldest, that the Gaylords have never sold the land they have acquired.

However, their half billion dollar inheritance is held up in probate for decades; Fiona complains that they have practically grown up in court. Though they have a New York City Fifth Avenue mansion, the sisters have had to borrow money to live. A French charity claims that Penn made a later will before he died, leaving 10% of the Gaylord estate to it. Though the Gaylords are now willing to give up the 10%, their real antagonist, Charles Barclay, who wants their mansion, and the choice land on which it sits too, so that he can tear it down as part of his real estate development, Barclay Square. Fiona is determined not to give in to this.

Meanwhile, Evelyn has married an English nobleman, now fighting in the RAF, while Susie is in love with painter Gig Young, despite being married herself. Susanna only stayed with her husband for a few hours, but he refuses to grant her an annulment unless she pays him a great deal of money, to which of course she does not have access. When Evelyn returns home from England, she becomes attracted to Gig herself and tries to steal him away.

In 1941, Fiona fires the longtime Gaylord lawyer, Hershell Gibbon, when he appears to be too sympathetic to Charles. She hires Ralph Pedloch as his replacement. It is revealed that Fiona and Charles have a prior history together. Six years before, a relative died and left the sisters $100,000 on condition that Fiona be married. Fiona decided to go through with a sham marriage to a cousin, but ran into Charles, then a construction crew foreman, and found him much more attractive. Within a few days, she manipulated the lovestruck man into proposing. On their wedding night, she pretended to faint. While he went to purchase some medicine, she packed up, leaving a letter with $25,000, her wedding ring and an explanation. However, he returned before she left and forced her to have sex before letting her go. Fiona gave birth to a boy, Austin, and had him raised by a trusted friend. When that friend died, Fiona brought the now six-year-old to live with her. Unexpectedly, she finds herself becoming very fond of the child.

When Susie tries to commit suicide after it appears that she has lost Gig, Fiona finally realizes that the toll her stubborn determination has exacted on her family. She gives up the mansion and grants Charles sole custody of Austin. In the end, Gig chooses the now-single Susie, and Charles tells Fiona that he still loves her. Fiona embraces and kisses him.

Cast
 Barbara Stanwyck as Fiona Gaylord
 George Brent as Charles Barclay
 Geraldine Fitzgerald as Lady Evelyn Gaylord Burton
 Donald Crisp as Ralph Pedloch
 Byron Barr as Gig Young
 Nancy Coleman as Susanna "Susie" Gaylord Allen
 Gene Lockhart as Mr. Herschell Gibbon
 Larry Simms as Austin, aka "Butch"
 Donald Woods as Penn Sutherland Gaylord
 Grant Mitchell as Gilbert Wheeler
 William T. Orr as Dick Tone
 Anne Revere as Miss Ida Orner
 Helene Thimig as Saskia, the Gaylord maid
 George Lessey as Judge Barrows
 Charles Waldron as Mr. Van Rennseler (as Charles D. Waldron)
 Frank Reicher as Dr. Thomas Bigelow
 David Clyde as Benson, Penn's servant
 Mary Thomas as Fiona Gaylord as a girl of eight

Box Office
According to Warner Bros records the film earned $1,728,000 domestically and $857,000 foreign.

References

External links

 
 
 

1942 films
1942 romantic drama films
American romantic drama films
Films based on American novels
Films directed by Irving Rapper
Films set in 1941
Films set in New York City
Warner Bros. films
American black-and-white films
1940s English-language films
1940s American films